Lithuania competed at the 2001 World Aquatics Championships in Fukuoka, Japan.

Swimming

4 swimmers represented Lithuania:

Men

References

Nations at the 2001 World Aquatics Championships
2001 in Lithuanian sport
Lithuania at the World Aquatics Championships